Eatoniella kerguelenensis is a species of minute sea snail, a marine gastropod mollusk in the family Eatoniellidae, the eatoniellids.

Subspecies
 Eatoniella kerguelenensis chiltoni (Suter, 1909)
 Eatoniella kerguelenensis regularis (E. A. Smith, 1915)
Forma
 Eatoniella kerguelenensis f. contusa Strebel, 1908: synonym of Eatoniella contusa Strebel, 1908 (original combination)
 Eatoniella kerguelenensis f. major Strebel, 1908 : synonym of Eatoniella glacialis (E. A. Smith, 1907)

Description

Distribution

References

Eatoniellidae
Gastropods described in 1875
Fauna of the Kerguelen Islands